Sarapulsky District (Sarapul joros) is an administrative and municipal district (raion), one of the twenty-five in the Udmurt Republic, Russia. It is located in the southeast of the republic. Its administrative center is the rural locality (a selo) of Sigayevo. Population:  24,215 (2002 Census);  The population of Sigayevo accounts for 22.9% of the district's total population.

References

Sources

Districts of Udmurtia